Butch (formerly known as Spike) is an animated cartoon character created by Tex Avery. Portrayed as an anthropomorphic Irish bulldog, the character was a recurring antagonist in the Droopy shorts, and appeared in his own series of solo shorts as well. His name was changed to Butch to avoid confusion with Spike from the Tom and Jerry cartoons. All of the original 1940s and 1950s shorts were directed by Avery and Michael Lah at the Metro-Goldwyn-Mayer cartoon studio. Butch would not appear in new material again until Tom and Jerry: The Magic Ring in 2002.

Butch solo cartoons

Appearances in Droopy cartoons 
 Wags to Riches (1949) – Academy Award shortlist; first time Spike appears as Droopy's rival.
 The Chump Champ (1950)
 Daredevil Droopy (1951)
 Droopy's Good Deed (1951)
 Droopy's Double Trouble (1951)
 Deputy Droopy (1955)
 Millionaire Droopy (1956) – a CinemaScope remake of Wags to Riches directed by Tex Avery.
 Grin and Share It (1957)
 Blackboard Jumble (1957)
 One Droopy Knight (1957) – a remake of Señor Droopy, Academy Award nominee.
 Mutts About Racing (1958)
 Droopy Leprechaun (1958)

Later appearances
Butch reappeared in direct-to-DVD films such as Tom and Jerry: The Magic Ring and Tom and Jerry Meet Sherlock Holmes, alongside Droopy.

His latest appearance was in 2014's The Tom and Jerry Show. He appeared in the episode "Double Dog Trouble", where Spike and Butch are two separate characters who are twins, in order to poke at the character's retitling, while detectives Tom and Jerry mistake each one for the other after Spike buys a room at the town's motel.

Voice actors 
 Tex Avery (Bad Luck Blackie, Wags to Riches, The Counterfeit Cat, Ventriloquist Cat, Garden Gopher, Cock-a-Doodle Dog, Daredevil Droopy, Droopy's Good Deed, Magical Maestro, Rock-a-Bye Bear, Millionaire Droopy, Cat's Meow)
 William Hanna (screaming in Wags to Riches, Garden Gopher, Rock-a-Bye Bear, Cellbound and Millionaire Droopy)
 Sara Berner (laughing in Wags to Riches, Garden Gopher, Rock-a-Bye Bear and Millionaire Droopy, screaming in Wags to Riches and Millionaire Droopy)
 Daws Butler (The Chump Champ, Droopy's Double Trouble, Blackboard Jumble)
 Bill Thompson (Droopy's Double Trouble, Grin and Share It, One Droopy Knight, Mutts About Racing, Droopy Leprechaun)
 Carlos Julio Ramírez (Magical Maestro)
 Frank Ross (Magical Maestro)
 Mary Kaye (Magical Maestro)
 Paul Frees (Magical Maestro, Cellbound)
 Norman Kaye (Magical Maestro)
 Jeff Bergman (Cartoon Network bumper, Tom and Jerry Meet Sherlock Holmes)
 Jim Cummings (Tom and Jerry: The Magic Ring)
 Joe Alaskey (Tom and Jerry and the Wizard of Oz, Tom and Jerry: Back to Oz)
 Bill Farmer (The Tom and Jerry Show)

References

Film characters introduced in 1949
Film series introduced in 1949
Fictional dogs
MGM cartoon characters
Fictional anthropomorphic characters
Male characters in animation
Male characters in television
Tex Avery
Metro-Goldwyn-Mayer cartoon studio film series